Coleophora albipennella is a moth of the family Coleophoridae. It is found in Asia Minor.

References

albipennella
Moths described in 1879
Moths of Asia